Patrice Baldwin FRSA is Chair of the Council for Subject Associations in the United Kingdom. She was President of the International Drama and Theatre Education Association (IDEA) from 2010–13.  She was Chair of National Drama from 2004 to 2015. ND is the UK’s leading professional  subject association for UK drama and theatre educators. She is the Director of D4LC (Drama for Learning and Creativity).

Overview 
Patrice Baldwin is internationally recognised as a leading practitioner, trainer, workshop leader and speaker in the world of 'Drama for Learning'.  She was Chair of National Drama (the leading association of drama and theatre educators) for more than a decade (until November 2014) and was President of the International Drama Theatre and Education Association (IDEA) from 2010 – 2013. She has also been an Executive Council Member of the World Alliance for Arts Education (WAAE). 

During the pandemic she was Oak National Academy's Subject Leader for Primary Drama and also delivered online training sessions for Drama and Theatre organisations in Australia, India, Turkey and New Zealand, as well as regular online sessions through National Drama (UK). In July 2022, she delivered workshops in Iceland, at IDEA's 9th World Congress.   

Patrice Baldwin has written many articles and books for teachers, on the use of drama for learning across the curriculum and has a particular interest in links between drama, learning through imagining and neuroscience. She writes regularly for 'Drama and Theatre' magazine and for 'Drama' (National Drama's magazine).  She is particularly known for her work on improving thinking, oracy and writing through Drama. 
 
Patrice Baldwin was a primary school headteacher for eleven years and still works in schools on a consultancy basis for drama for learning, improving teaching, cultural and creative learning and primary curriculum development. She was an Ofsted inspector and a School Improvement Partner.  For several years she worked as a BBC series consultant and scriptwriter for Let's Make a Story and also wrote scripts for First Steps in Drama and stories and dramatisations for Together, a BBC radio assembly programme for primary schools.

From April 2000 to June 2011 Patrice Baldwin was the local authority arts adviser for Norfolk County Council Children's Services but decided to go freelance in June 2011. This enabled her to devote more time to working internationally and to developing 'Drama for Learning' in the UK.  Follow her extensive education work, publications and travels by visiting her Drama Blog  and her website     You can also join the D4LC Facebook group she set up,  to keep in contact with thousands of drama educators worldwide.

Patrice Baldwin created 'Drama for Learning and Creativity' (D4LC), a national school improvement initiative that was piloted in Norfolk in 2005 and was supported by the Qualifications and Curriculum Authority, Creative Partnerships and the National Endowment for Science, Technology and the Arts as well as Norfolk County Council and National Drama. D4LC later became an IDEA project and spread internationally. She presented it at UNESCO's 2nd International Arts Education Conference in South Korea and in Taiwan and Newcastle at World Creativity Summits.  D4LC is an initiative that links visiting drama specialists with pairs of non-specialist drama teachers in schools. Together they work in partnership to use drama as a way of learning and teaching with whole classes. They evaluate and share the impact. More than 280 schools in Norfolk became 'D4LC schools' from 2005 – 2010 and other parts of the UK (Newport and Dorset) also set up D4LC based initiatives. D4LC was also started in Iceland as 'FLISS'  and proved successful with UK museum educators who wanted to extend their use of drama for learning in museums.

Patrice is a well established national and international drama workshop leader and conference keynote speaker on drama, education, arts and Creativity. In April 2011 she became freelance, in order to focus more freely on her international work. Patrice has presented at Conferences in Greece, Turkey, Iceland, Germany, Austria, Poland, Hong Kong, Taiwan, South Korea, Australia, The Philippines, France, Norway, Sweden, Finland, New Zealand, Singapore, US and Canada, Argentina and Uruguay.  She was a speaker at the 2008 and 2009 World Creativity Summits in Taiwan and Newcastle and keynote speaker at Drama Australia's 2011 Conference in Perth. She presented in June 2011 at the first Drama in Education Conference in Singapore and in 2012/13 at many Conferences, including in New Hampshire (January 2012), New Zealand (April 2012), Turkey (May and November 2012), France (May 2012), Iceland (August 2012), Canada (October 2012), Greece (November 2012), Sweden (January and May 2013), Hong Kong and Singapore (February 2013), Australia (March 2013) and France (July 2013).  During 2013 she became the Cultural Leader in Theatre and Performing Arts, for Brock University, Canada. 

In 2009 she was a member of Sir Jim Rose's Editorial Expert group drafting a new primary National Curriculum for England. This curriculum did not get through Parliament before the June 2010 General Election.  She is now working in partnership with various Academy Chains and schools in the UK, as well being a visiting fellow at various universities. 

Patrice has also set up a CPD service for Norfolk schools and provides courses for a range of curriculum areas. See her website for more details. www.patricebaldwin.com

Books 
Stimulating Drama – out of print

The Drama Box and The Drama Book – out of print

Teaching Literacy Through Drama: Creative Approaches (co-written with Kate Fleming)
 

With Drama in Mind: Real Learning in Imagined Worlds
 

With Drama in Mind: Real Learning in Imagined Worlds (second edition)
 

The Primary Drama Handbook
 

School Improvement Through Drama
 

Inspiring Writing Through Drama (co-written with Rob John)
 

Process Drama for Second Language Teaching and Learning (co-written with Alicja Galazka)

References

External links 
 Official site
 Drama Blog
 National Drama
 International Drama Theatre and Education Association
 Drama for Learning and Creativity

Year of birth missing (living people)
Living people
British businesspeople